Skate or Skates may refer to:

Fish

Skate (fish), several genera of fish belonging to the family Rajidae
Pygmy skates, several genera of fish belonging to the family Gurgesiellidae
Smooth skates or leg skates, several genera of fish belonging to the family Anacanthobatidae
Softnose skates, several genera of fish belonging to the family Arhynchobatidae

Sports
Ice skate
Figure skate
Inline skates
Roller skates
Skateboard
 Skate-skiing, a cross-country skiing technique
Oakland Skates, former professional roller hockey team

Ships
 Skate (dinghy), national small sailboat class unique to Australia
 HMS Skate (1895), a Victorian era destroyer of the United Kingdom
 , an  destroyer in commission from 1917 to 1947.
 USS Skate, several submarines of the US Navy

Other
Skate of Marrister, Shetland
 Skate (series), an extreme sports video game series
 Skate (2007 video game), the first game in the series
 Skate (upcoming video game), the fourth game in the series
 SKATE or Game of Skate, a skateboarding game
Skates!, a book by Ezra Jack Keats
 ZTE Skate, an Android-based smartphone
 Skate, the code name for the October 1944  Bombing of Braunschweig
 "Skate (song)" by American R&B superduo Silk Sonic

See also
 Skater (disambiguation)
 Skating (disambiguation)
 SK8 (programming language), a multimedia environment developed by Apple
 Sk8 (TV series), an American television series that aired in 2001
 SK8-TV, an American television series that aired in 1990
 wheelskate a device used to lift a vehicle with wheel damage to move it to a depot